This is an alphabetical list of notable people who have been diagnosed with pancreatic cancer. Boldfaced names were alive in November 2022.
 Shirley Abrahamson (1933–2020; aged 87), American judge and 25th chief justice of the Wisconsin Supreme Court.
 Dorothy Arnold (1917–1984; aged 66), American actress.
 Charles Arnt (1906–1990; aged 83), American actor.
 Syd Barrett (1946–2006; aged 60), English musician and co-founder of Pink Floyd.
 Count Basie (1904–1984; aged 79), American jazz pianist and bandleader.
 Alphonzo E. Bell Jr. (1914–2004; aged 89), American congressman.
 Jack Benny (1894–1974; aged 80), American comedian and entertainer.
 John Berardino (1917–1996; aged 79), American actor and baseball player.
 Joseph Bernardin (1928–1996; aged 68), American cardinal, archbishop of Cincinnati and later Chicago.
 Ruschell Boone (born c.1975), Jamaican-born American television journalist.
 Bobby Bowden (1929–2021; aged 91), American college football coach for the Florida State Seminoles (1976–2009).
 Wernher von Braun (1912–1977; aged 65), German aerospace engineer and later the lead designer of the American rocket Saturn V.
 Mary Ward Brown (1917–2013; aged 95), Alabama short story writer and memoirist.
 Madeleine Carroll (1906–1987; aged 81), British-American actress and humanitarian.
 Billy Carter (1937–1988; aged 51), brother of former President of the United States Jimmy Carter.
 Gloria Carter Spann (1926–1990; aged 63), sister of Jimmy Carter.
 James Earl Carter Sr. (1894–1953; aged 58), father of Jimmy Carter.
 Ruth Carter Stapleton (1929–1983; aged 54), American Christian evangelist, sister of Jimmy Carter.
 Geneviève Castrée (1981–2016; aged 35), French-Canadian musician, illustrator and wife of Phil Elverum.
 Johnny Clegg (1953–2019; aged 66), English-born South African musician.
 William R. Cotter (1926–1981; aged 55), American congressman.
 Joan Crawford (c.1906–1977; aged 69–73), American actress.
 Richard Crenna (1926–2003; aged 76), American actor.
 Chuck Daly (1930–2009; aged 79), American basketball head coach, member of NBA Hall of Fame.
 Donna Douglas (1932–2015; aged 82), American actress.
 Umberto Eco (1932–2016; aged 84), Italian professor and novelist (The Name of the Rose, Foucault's Pendulum).
 Vince Edwards (1928–1996; aged 68), American actor.
 Ralph Eggleston (1965–2022; aged 56), American art director and animator.
 Ralph Ellison (1913–1994; aged 81), American writer, winner of National Book Award for Invisible Man.
 Nayana Ferguson (born 1973), co-founder and CEO of Anteel Tequila.
 Art Fleming (1924–1995; aged 70), American actor and television presenter (Jeopardy!).
 Eddie Foy Jr. (1905–1983; aged 78), American actor.
 Anne Francis (1930–2011; aged 80), American actress.
 Aretha Franklin (1942–2018; aged 76), American singer and pianist ("Respect", "(You Make Me Feel Like) A Natural Woman").
 Bonnie Franklin (1944–2013; aged 69), American actress (One Day at a Time).
 Peggy Ann Garner (1932–1984; aged 52), American actress.
 Willie Garson (1964–2021; aged 57), American actor (Sex and the City, Hawaii Five-0, Stargate SG-1).
 Ben Gazzara (1930–2012; aged 82), American actor.
 Bob Gibson (1935–2020; aged 84), American baseball pitcher.
 Dizzy Gillespie (1917–1993; aged 75), American bebop jazz trumpeter and bandleader.
 Alfred G. Gilman (1941–2015; aged 74), American pharmacologist and biochemist.
 Ruth Bader Ginsburg (1933–2020; aged 87), Associate Justice of the Supreme Court of the United States.
 Fred Gwynne (1926–1993; aged 67), American actor.
 Terry Hall (1959–2022; aged 63), English musician and singer (The Specials, The Colourfield, Fun Boy Three).
 Sir Rex Harrison (1908–1990; aged 82), English actor.
 Alcee Hastings (1936–2021; aged 84), American congressman and judge.
 Bill Hicks (1961–1994; aged 32), American comedian and musician.
 Michael Houser (1962–2002; aged 40), American musician and founder of the band Widespread Panic.
 Sir John Hurt (1940–2017; aged 77), English actor.
 Eric Idle (born 1943), English actor and comedian.
 Eiko Ishioka (1938–2012; aged 73), Japanese costume designer and art director.
 Satoru Iwata (1959–2015; aged 55), Japanese businessman, video game programmer and chief executive officer of Nintendo.
 Joe Jackson (1928–2018; aged 89), American talent manager and patriarch of the Jackson family.
 Steve Jobs (1955–2011; aged 56), American entrepreneur, business magnate and chief executive officer of Apple.
 Wilko Johnson (1947–2022; aged 75), English guitarist and singer-songwriter (Dr. Feelgood).
 Robert Katzmann (1953–2021; aged 68), United States circuit judge.
 Tim Keller (born 1950), American pastor, theologian, and Christian apologist.
 Irrfan Khan (1967–2020; aged 53), Indian Hollywood and Bollywood actor.
 Dmitri Kolker (1968–2022; aged 54), Russian physicist.
 Satoshi Kon (1963–2010; aged 46), Japanese film director and animator.
 Karl Lagerfeld (1933–2019; aged 85), German fashion designer, creative director of Chanel.
 Fiorello La Guardia (1882–1947; aged 64), American politician, mayor of New York City.
 Fernando Lamas (1915–1982; aged 67), Argentine-American actor and director.
 Michael Landon (1936–1991; aged 54), American actor (Bonanza, Little House on the Prairie, Highway to Heaven).
 John Lewis (1940–2020; aged 80), American civil rights activist, politician, and Democratic Congressman from Georgia.
 Roger Lloyd-Pack (1944–2014; aged 69), English actor (Only Fools and Horses, The Vicar of Dibley, Harry Potter, Doctor Who).
 Charlie Louvin (1927–2011; aged 83), American country music singer.
 René Magritte (1898–1967; aged 68), Belgian surrealist artist.
 Henry Mancini (1924–1994; aged 70), American film composer, conductor, pianist and flautist.
 Benoit Mandelbrot (1924–2010; aged 85), Polish-born French and American mathematician.
 Joseph Mar Thoma (1931–2020; aged 89), Malankara Metropolitan.
 Kenneth Mars (1935–2011; aged 75), American actor.
 Dame Clare Marx (1954–2022; aged 68), British surgeon.
 Marcello Mastroianni (1924–1996; aged 72), Italian film director.
 Hazel McCallion (1921–2023; aged 101), Canadian politician, longtime Mayor of Mississauga, Ontario (1978–2014).
 Marian McCargo (1932–2004; aged 72), American actress and champion tennis player.
 Frank McGarvey (1956–2023; aged 66), Scottish professional footballer (Scotland National Team, Celtic, St Mirren).
 Margaret Mead (1901–1978; aged 76), American cultural anthropologist (Coming of Age in Samoa).
 Nargis (1929–1981; aged 51), Indian actress.
 Benjamin Orr (1947–2000; aged 53), American musician and co-founder of the rock band The Cars.
 Billy Paul (1934–2016; aged 81), American soul singer ("Me and Mrs. Jones").
 Wolfgang Pauli (1900–1958; aged 58), Austrian pioneer of quantum physics, winner of Nobel Prize.
 Randy Pausch (1960–2008; aged 47), American educator.
 Luciano Pavarotti (1935–2007; aged 71), Italian operatic tenor.
 Brock Peters (1927–2005; aged 78), American actor.
 Wolfgang Petersen (1941–2022; aged 81), German film director (Das Boot, Air Force One).
 Webb Pierce (1921–1991; aged 70), American honky-tonk vocalist.
 Pete Postlethwaite (1946–2011; aged 64) English actor.
 Harve Presnell (1933–2009; aged 76), American actor.
 Ray Price (1926–2013; aged 87), American country music singer.
 Juliet Prowse (1936–1996; aged 60), Indian-American dancer and actress.
 Sam Rayburn (1882–1961; aged 79), American politician and longest-serving Speaker of the U.S. House of Representatives.
 Donna Reed (1921–1986; aged 65), American actress.
 Harry Reid (1939–2021; aged 82), American politician and lawyer who served as Senate Majority Leader.
 Alan Rickman (1946–2016; aged 69), English actor and director (Harry Potter, Die Hard, Love Actually).
 Sally Ride (1951–2012; aged 61), American astronaut and physicist.
 Pernell Roberts (1928–2010; aged 82), American actor.
 Denise Robertson (1932–2016; aged 83), British writer, television broadcaster and agony aunt (Breakfast Time, This Morning).
 Simone Signoret (1921–1985; aged 64), French actress.
 Felix Silla (1937–2021; aged 84), American actor and stuntman.
 Mickey Spillane (1918–2006; aged 88), American crime novelist (detective Mike Hammer).
 Patrick Swayze (1952–2009; aged 57), American actor (Dirty Dancing, Ghost, Donnie Darko).
 Sir Denis Thatcher (1915–2003; aged 88), British businessman and husband of Prime Minister Margaret Thatcher.
 Dyanne Thorne (1936–2020; aged 83), American actress.
 Alex Trebek (1940–2020; aged 80), Canadian television personality and presenter (Jeopardy!). 
 Linda Tripp (1949–2020; aged 70), American civil servant.
 Gianluca Vialli (1964–2023; aged 58), Italian professional football player and manager.
 Roger Williams (1924–2011; aged 87), American popular music pianist.
 Keenan Wynn (1916–1986; aged 70), American actor.
 Irving Younger (1932–1988; aged 55), American lawyer, law professor, judge and writer.

See also
 :Category:Deaths from pancreatic cancer – over 1,000 notable names listed

References

 Pancreatic cancer
Pancreatic cancer